The 1997–98 NCAA Division III men's ice hockey season began in October 1997 and concluded on March 21 of the following year. This was the 25th season of Division III college ice hockey.

Quinnipiac and Fairfield began the season as members of ECAC North/South/Central, however, because the teams were preparing to be founding members of the MAAC's ice hockey conference the following year they had begun to offer athletic scholarships. Conference rules strictly forbade any athletic scholarships and both schools (in December and February respectively) were ruled ineligible to play in the conference postseason. Additionally, all games played by Fairfield and Quinnipiac would not be counted in the conference standings. Sacred Heart was also excluded from ECAC tournament play for similar reasons. Though the three teams were officially members of ECAC North/South/Central, they are sometimes considered as independents for this season as a result of not playing any conference games.

Regular season

Season tournaments

Standings

Note: Mini-game are not included in final standings

1998 NCAA Tournament

Note: * denotes overtime period(s)

See also
 1997–98 NCAA Division I men's ice hockey season
 1997–98 NCAA Division II men's ice hockey season

References

External links

 
NCAA